Jamstik is a brand of portable, app-connected (MIDI) guitars made by Zivix—a music technology company based in Minneapolis, MN.  Jamstik is made in the United States, designed in Minneapolis, and manufactured by a South Dakota-based contract manufacturer.

Media coverage & awards 
One of the earliest public media demonstrations of the Jamstik was in January 2013 on the TechCrunch stage of the Consumer Electronic Show in Las Vegas.

Although not released until 2014, the Jamstik was recognized by Popular Science as one of the most innovative inventions of 2013.

The original Jamstik received a "Best In Show" award from the North American Music Merchants (NAMM) trade show in 2014.

Product variations 
Jamstik (Original WiFi edition)

The original Jamstik was launched in 2014 on Indiegogo, raising over $175,000 from nearly 850 supporters. The original Jamstik connects to an iPad, iPhone, or Mac via WiFi. The Jamstik is primarily used through its compatible apps, Jamstik and JamTutor, but is also compatible with other music apps such as GarageBand, Animoog, and more. The Jamstik has 6 strings, 5 frets and weighs 1 lb 9 oz. Jamstik connects to iOS devices and comes with three free mobile apps, including JamTutor - an instructional app that is intended to teach users the basics of guitar with arcade-like games & challenges. The Jamstik has infrared transmitters that sense where a player's fingers are on the fretboard, which allows users to determine if they are playing the right or wrong note.

Jamstik+ (Bluetooth version)

In 2015, Zivix raised over $813,000 on Kickstarter to fund the second generation Jamstik, dubbed the "Jamstik+" ("Jamstik plus"), making it the 2nd most successful crowdfunding campaign to ever hail from Minnesota. Zivix's Kickstarter campaign included new upgraded features in the Jamstik+, such as Bluetooth LE MIDI Support (instead of WiFi), Hammer-On/Pull-Off support, and Support for Multiple devices connected to the same iPad/Laptop.

Jamstik 7

In May 2018, Zivix launched the third-generation version of its Jamstik Smart Guitars, the "Jamstik 7" on Indiegogo. To commemorate the success of its crowdfunding campaign, Zivix announced it will be donating 2% of total funds raised during the campaign to The NAMM Foundation's Bill Collings Memorial Fund, a fund which supports student and guitar teacher education. Zivix has also chosen to solidify its giving by committing 1% of future retail sales of the new products as a standing commitment to support the Foundation.

References 

Game controllers
Guitar Hero
Rock Band series